In Search of Gregory is a 1969 British-Italian drama film directed by Peter Wood and starring Julie Christie.

Plot
Catherine Morelli goes to the latest wedding of her father, Max, who in turn wants to introduce her there to a potential suitor, Gregory Mulvey.

Cast
 Julie Christie as Catherine Morelli
 Michael Sarrazin as Gregory Mulvey
 John Hurt as Daniel
 Adolfo Celi as Max
 Paola Pitagora as Nicole
 Roland Culver as Wardle
 Tony Selby as Taxi Driver
 Ernesto Pagano as Priest
 Violetta Chiarini as Paquita
 Luisa De Santis as Giselle
 Gabriella Giorgelli as Encarna
 Gordon Gostelow as Old Man
 Tony Selby as Taxi Driver

References

External links
 In Search of Gregory (1969) at DBCult Film Institute 

1969 films
1969 drama films
British drama films
Italian drama films
Films directed by Peter Wood
Films with screenplays by Tonino Guerra
Films scored by Ron Grainer
Universal Pictures films
1960s English-language films
1960s British films
1960s Italian films